A view is a sight or prospect or the ability to see or be seen from a particular place.  

View, views or Views may also refer to:

Common meanings
 View (Buddhism), a charged interpretation of experience which intensely shapes and affects thought, sensation, and action
 Graphical projection in a technical drawing or schematic
 Multiview orthographic projection, standardizing 2D images to represent a 3D object
 Opinion, a belief about subjective matters
 Page view, a visit to a World Wide Web page
 Panorama, a wide-angle view
 Scenic viewpoint, an elevated location where people can view scenery 
 World view,  the fundamental cognitive orientation of an individual or society encompassing the entirety of the individual or society's knowledge and point-of-view

Places
 View, Kentucky, an unincorporated community in Crittenden County
 View, Texas, an unincorporated community in Taylor County

Arts, entertainment, and media

Music
 View (album), the 2003 debut album by Bryan Beller
 Views (album), a 2016 album by Canadian rapper Drake
 Views, a 2001 album by Pekka Pohjola
 "View", a song by Shinee from the album Odd, 2015

Other
 View (magazine), an American literary and art magazine published from 1940 to 1947
 VIEWS, a podcast hosted by David Dobrik

Technology
 View (SQL), a table generated from a stored relational database query
 VIEW, a word processor computer program developed by Acornsoft for the BBC Micro home computer
 Model–view–controller, a design pattern in software engineering
 Mutual view, the quality or degree of visibility of a satellite to a ground station in satellite communications
 View, Inc.,  American manufacturer of smart glass
 View model, a concept in enterprise architecture

See also
 Point of view (disambiguation)
 The View (disambiguation)
 Viewer (disambiguation)
 Viewing (disambiguation)